Brady's Irish Cream is an Irish whiskey and cream based liqueur that is produced in Ireland, northwest of Dublin. The brand is owned by New York-based company Castle Brands Inc. It is comparable to other cream liqueurs like Bailey's and Amarula.

Production
Brady's Irish Cream is produced in County Cavan, Ireland.

The brand emphasizes the freshness of its ingredients, stating that the cream is used within 48 hours of reaching the distillery. It is then combined with Irish whiskey, as well as other flavorings before being bottled. It has an alcohol content of 17% ABV.

Reviews
Brady's received a 91 and “Great Value” award at the 2012 Ultimate Spirits Challenge.

References

External links
Brady's website
CBI website

Irish liqueurs
Cream liqueurs